Gabriela Dauerer (born 1958 in Nuremberg, West Germany) is a contemporary German painter. She is representative of a kind of minimalistic painting.

Life 

From 1979 to 1986, Dauerer studied painting and graphic arts at the Akademie der Bildenden Künste Nürnberg (Academy of Fine Arts, Nuremberg) with Professors Ernst Weil and Christine Colditz. During this time, she won the Academy's award and a scholarship of the Deutsch-Französisches Jugendwerk (German-French Youth Promotion) for a stay of three years at Villa Arson in Nice (France).

From 1984 to 1986 she passed a diploma study in Nice at Ecole Pilote Internationale d'Art et de Recherche with Professor Ben Vautier, among others.

In 1986 Dauerer won the Bavarian Award of First Appearance for young littérateurs and visual artists. One year in Florence followed in 1988 in the course of Villa Romana Award.

In 1992 Dauerer spent one year in New York City and Tucson in the United States due to a scholarship of the Bavarian States Ministry of Science and Arts.

She represented Monaco together with Barbara Sillari at the 50th Venice Biennale, in 2003, with their project work Il sogno que risorge dalla vita ("The Dream that Rises from Life").

Awards 
 1988 Villa Romana prize
 1989 Bayerischer Kulturförderpreis (Award of Cultural Promotion)
 1991 Promotion award of Stadtwerke Mönchengladbach
 2003 Wolfram-von-Eschenbach-Förderpreis (promotion award)
 2004 2nd Arts Award of the Nürnberger Nachrichten

See also
 List of German painters

References

External links 

 Homepage Gabriela Dauerer

1958 births
20th-century German painters
21st-century German painters
German women painters
Living people
Artists from Nuremberg
Academy of Fine Arts, Nuremberg alumni
20th-century German women
21st-century German women